Petra Westerhof  (born 27 June 1969) is a Dutch female Paralympic sitting volleyball player. She is part of the Netherlands women's national sitting volleyball team.

She competed at the 2004 Summer Paralympics finishing second, and 2008 Summer Paralympics finishing third,

References

1969 births
Living people
Dutch amputees
Dutch sitting volleyball players
Dutch sportswomen
Medalists at the 2008 Summer Paralympics
Paralympic volleyball players of the Netherlands
Volleyball players at the 2008 Summer Paralympics
Women's sitting volleyball players
Medalists at the 2004 Summer Paralympics
Paralympic medalists in volleyball
Paralympic silver medalists for the Netherlands
Paralympic bronze medalists for the Netherlands
20th-century Dutch women
21st-century Dutch women